Hywel Davies  (20 November 1902 — 16 August 1976) was a Welsh international footballer. He was part of the Wales national football team, playing one match on 4 February 1928 against Ireland.

At club level, he played two seasons for Wrexham from 1927-1929.

References

1902 births
1976 deaths
Welsh footballers
Wales international footballers
Wrexham A.F.C. players
Wales amateur international footballers
Association football forwards